Alabama Wild Man is a song written and recorded by American country artist Jerry Reed. It was released in July 1972 as the only single from the album, Jerry Reed. The song reached peaks of number 22 on the U.S. country chart and number 12 on the Canadian RPM Country Tracks chart. The B-side, "Take It Easy (In Your Mind)," would later be sampled in the 1972 top ten hit "Convention '72" by The Delegates.

Chart performance

References

1972 singles
Jerry Reed songs
Songs written by Jerry Reed
Song recordings produced by Chet Atkins
1972 songs